Eugene Harold "Gene" Corman (September 24, 1927 – September 28, 2020) was an American film producer and agent. He and his older brother, Roger, co-founded New World Pictures.

Biography
Corman entered the film industry before his brother, working as an agent. He became vice president of MCA, representing such clients as Joan Crawford, Fred MacMurray, Richard Conte, Harry Belafonte, and Ray Milland. He moved into producing in the late 1950s, making a number of movies with Bernard L. Kowalski and Robert L. Lippert as well as his brother, Roger.

In the early 1970s, he had his own producing unit at MGM. He later became vice-president of 20th Century Fox Television.

Filmography
I Mobster (1958)
Hot Car Girl (1958)
Night of the Blood Beast (1958)
Beast from the Haunted Cave (1959)
Attack of the Giant Leeches (1959)
Valley of the Redwoods (1960)
 The Secret of the Purple Reef (1960)
The Intruder (1962)
The Tower of London (1962)
The Secret Invasion (1964)
The Girls on the Beach (1965)
Ski Party (1965)
Beach Ball (1965)
Tobruk (1967)
You Can't Win 'Em All (1970)
Von Richthofen and Brown (1971)
Cool Breeze (1972)
Private Parts (1972)
Hit Man (1972)
The Slams (1973)
I Escaped from Devil's Island (1973)
Darktown Strutters (1975)
Vigilante Force (1976)
F.I.S.T. (1978)
The Big Red One (1980)
A Woman Called Golda (1982) (TV movie)
Vital Parts (2001)

References

External links

1927 births
2020 deaths
Film producers from Michigan
American talent agents
American independent film production company founders
Place of death missing